The women's 400 metre individual medley competition at the 2010 Pan Pacific Swimming Championships took place on August 19 at the William Woollett Jr. Aquatics Center.  The last champion was Katie Hoff of US.

This race consisted of eight lengths of the pool. The first two lengths were swum using the butterfly stroke, the second pair with the backstroke, the third pair of lengths in breaststroke, and the final two were freestyle.

Records
Prior to this competition, the existing world and Pan Pacific records were as follows:

Results
All times are in minutes and seconds.

Heats
The first round was held on August 19, at 10:54.

B Final 
The B final was held on August 19, at 18:57.

A Final 
The A final was held on August 19, at 18:57.

References

2010 Pan Pacific Swimming Championships
2010 in women's swimming